The Pittsburgh Pennsylvania Temple is a temple of the Church of Jesus Christ of Latter-day Saints (LDS Church) under construction in the Cranberry Township suburb of Pittsburgh. The intent to construct the temple was announced on April 5, 2020, during the general conference by church president Russell M. Nelson. The temple is the church's second in the state of Pennsylvania, and the first temple in the western part of the state.

History

On January 20, 2021, the LDS Church announced the temple would be built on the 2000 block of Powell Road in Cranberry. This location places the temple on a 5.8 acre site next to an existing church meetinghouse.

Ground was broken for the temple on August 23, 2021. Local community leaders were present for the ceremonies which were presided over by Randall K. Bennett, a church general authority.

See also

 Comparison of temples of The Church of Jesus Christ of Latter-day Saints
 List of temples of The Church of Jesus Christ of Latter-day Saints
 List of temples of The Church of Jesus Christ of Latter-day Saints by geographic region
 Temple architecture (Latter-day Saints)
 The Church of Jesus Christ of Latter-day Saints in Pennsylvania

References

External links

Pittsburgh Pennsylvania Temple Official site
Pittsburgh Pennsylvania Temple at ChurchofJesusChristTemples.org

2016 establishments in Pennsylvania
2016 in Christianity
21st-century Latter Day Saint temples
The Church of Jesus Christ of Latter-day Saints in Pennsylvania
Temples (LDS Church) in the United States